Abd Al Naser Hasan is a Syrian footballer who plays for Naft Al-Janoob in Iraq.

References

Living people
1990 births
Syrian footballers
Syria international footballers
Al-Wahda SC (Syria) players
Syrian expatriate footballers
Expatriate footballers in Lebanon
Syrian expatriate sportspeople in Lebanon
People from Qamishli
Syrian expatriate sportspeople in Iraq
Expatriate footballers in Iraq
Association football defenders
Nejmeh SC players
Lebanese Premier League players
Syrian Premier League players